Auzata superba is a moth of the family Drepanidae first described by Arthur Gardiner Butler in 1878. It is found in Japan (Hokkaido, Honshu, Shikoku, Kyushu, Tsushima), the Korean Peninsula, Siberia and China.

The wingspan is about 40 mm.

The larvae feed on Cornus controversa and Cornus macrophylla.

Subspecies
Auzata superba superba
Auzata superba cristata Watson, 1959 (China)

References

Drepaninae
Moths of Asia
Moths described in 1878